The Battle at the Yadkin River was a military engagement of the Regulator Movement fought at the crossing of the Yadkin River on May 9, 1771, just a week prior to the Battle of Alamance, the final battle of the conflict.

Background
Governor William Tryon had dispatched Gen. Hugh Waddell to raise militia in Rowan and Mecklenburg counties for the purpose of capturing a force of Regulators under Benjamin Merrill known to be operating in the area.  Waddell reached Salisbury and attempted to march north, but was hampered when a large supply of gunpowder and firearms being brought by wagon from Charleston was captured and blown up by Regulators.

The battle
With little ammunition, Waddell hoped to link up with Tryon's militia but instead found his path blocked at the crossing of the Yadkin River by Merrill and a large force of Regulators.  A majority of his militiamen, many of whom sympathized with the Regulators, surrendered, and Waddell was compelled to turn back to Salisbury.  A couple of days later, the advance of a  company of reinforcements – a part of Governor William Tryon's army – contravened Merrill's planned rendezvous with forces under Regulator leader Herman Husband encamped at the Great Alamance Creek, and he was forced to turn to the east and deal with the new threat before heading to the rebel camp.

Aftermath
The several day's delay resulted in Merrill's troop arriving too late to play a role in the Battle of Alamance, and he and several others were captured and executed.  Waddell's remaining force eventually linked up with Tryon's troops at Reedy Creek on June 4, 1771, but the uprising was by that time essentially over.

References

 
 

Military history of the Thirteen Colonies
Pre-statehood history of North Carolina
Tax resistance in the United States
1771 in the Thirteen Colonies
Conflicts in 1771
Regulator Movement
1771 in North Carolina
Yadkin